Shaft is the soundtrack to the 2000 action film, Shaft. A mix of contemporary R&B and hip hop, it was released on June 6, 2000 through LaFace Records. The album peaked at number 22 on the Billboard 200 and number three on the Top R&B/Hip-Hop Albums chart. The song "Bad Man", by R. Kelly, was released as a single. On July 11, 2000, the soundtrack was certified gold. The soundtrack also marks the earliest appearance of rapper T.I.

Track listing

Certifications

References 

Hip hop soundtracks
Shaft (franchise)
2000 soundtrack albums
2000s film soundtrack albums
Albums produced by Warryn Campbell
LaFace Records soundtracks
Rhythm and blues soundtracks
Action film soundtracks
Thriller film soundtracks